HMS Glitter was an Admiralty steel drifter of the Royal Navy, constructed in 1918. She was one of 38 named vessels of the class that were completed in 1917-1918. She became a base ship in 1939, taking the name HMS Raleigh, and was sold into civilian service as Ocean Raleigh in 1946. She was scrapped in April 1960.

References

1918 ships